Angoulême (L'Angoumois) in western France was part of the Carolingian Empire as the kingdom of Aquitaine. Under Charlemagne's successors, the local Count of Angoulême was independent and was not united with the French crown until 1308. By the terms of the Treaty of Brétigny (1360) the Angoumois, then ruled by the Counts of Angoulême, was ceded as English territory to Edward III. In 1371 it became a fief of the Duke of Berry, before passing to Louis I, Duke of Orleans, both of whom were cadets of the French royal family. From then on it was held by cadets of the Valois House of Orleans, until Francis, Count of Angoulême, became King of France in 1515. Angoumois was definitively incorporated into the French crown lands, as a duchy.

Counts of Angoulême

House of Guilhelmides (Williami)
Turpio (839–863)
Emenon of Poitiers (863–866), brother of Turpio
Aymer of Poitiers (Aymer I of Angoulême) (916-926), son of Emenon

House of Taillefer

Wulgrin I (866–886), first hereditary count, appointed by Charles the Bald
Alduin I (886–916), son of Wulgrin I
William II ("Taillefer" I) (926–c.945), son of Alduin I
Aymer II (after 945–before 952), son of William II (Taillefer I)
Bernard (after 945–before 952), son of William I (William I is the son of Wulgrin I and brother to Alduin I)
Arnald I "Voratio" (after 950–before 952), son of Alduin I
William III "Talleyrand" (952/964–before 973/975), son of Bernard
Rannulf "Bompar" (973/975–975), son of Bernard
Richard the Simple (975?), son of Bernard
Arnald II "Manzer" (975–988), son of William II (Taillefer I)
William IV (Taillefer II) (988–1028), son of Arnald II
Alduin (II) (1028–1031), son of William IV (Taillefer II)
Geoffrey (1031–1047), son of William IV (Taillefer II)
Fulk (1047–1087), son of Geoffrey
William V (Taillefer III) (1087–1120), son of Fulk
Wulgrin II (1120–1140), son of William V (Taillefer III)
William VI (Taillefer IV) (1140–1179), son of Wulgrin II
Wulgrin III (1179–1181), son of William VI (Taillefer IV)
William VII (Taillefer V) (1181–1186), son of William VI (Taillefer IV)
Aymer III (1186–1202), son of William VI (Taillefer IV)
Isabella (1202–1246), daughter of Aymer III
John of England (House of Plantagenet) (1202–1216), first husband of Isabella
Hugh X of Lusignan (House of Lusignan, see below) (1220–1249), second husband of Isabella

House of Lusignan

Hugh X of Lusignan (Hugh I of Angoulême) (1219–1249). His father, Hugh IX of Lusignan, was married to Mathilde of Angoulême, daughter of Wulgrin III Taillefer (see above) 
Hugh XI of Lusignan (II of Angoulême) (1246–1250)
Hugh XII of Lusignan (III of Angoulême) (1250–1270)
Hugh XIII of Lusignan (IV of Angoulême) (1270–1303)
Guy (1303–1308)
Part of Aquitaine (1308–1317)
Royal Domain (1317–1328)

Royal Grantees
Joan (1328–1349) House of Capet, with her husband, Philip III of Navarre. House of Évreux
Philip (1328–1343) House of Évreux
Charles de La Cerda (1350–1354) House of La Cerda
John I (1356–1374) House of Valois
Louis I (1404–1407), Duke of Orléans. House of Valois-Orléans
John II (1407–1467) House of Valois-Orléans-Angoulême
Charles (1459–1496) House of Valois-Orléans-Angoulême
Francis (1496–1515) House of Valois-Orléans-Angoulême

Dukes of Angoulême

Louise (1515–1531)
Royal domain
Charles (1540–1545)
Royal domain
Charles (1550)
Henry (1551–1574)
Henry (1574–1582)
Diane (1582–1619)
Charles (1619–1650)
Louis Emmanuel (1650–1653)
Frances Marie (1653–1696)
Louis II (1653–1654)
Royal domain
Élisabeth Marguerite d'Orléans (1675–1696)
Royal domain
Charles de France (1710–1714)
Royal domain
Charles Philippe de France (1773–1836)
Louis Antoine d'Artois (1836–1844)
Royal domain

Duchesses of Angoulême
Louise of Savoy (1476–1531) - wife of Charles, Count of Angoulême from 1488.
Marie Thérèse of France (1778–1851) - wife of Louis Antoine from 1799.

Sources

Further reading
Hazlitt, W. Carew. The Coinage of the European Continent. London: Swan Sonnenschein, 1893.
Migne, Jacques-Paul. Dictionnaire de l'art de vérifier les dates des faits historiques, des chartes, des chroniques et autres anciens monuments. Paris: 1854.
Watson, Rowan Charles. The Counts of Angoulême from the 9th to the mid 13th Century. PhD dissertation. University of East Anglia, 1979.